The Nigger is a play by American playwright Edward Sheldon (1886–1946).  It explores the relationship between blacks and whites in the melodrama of a politician faced with a sudden, personal dilemma. The play was first performed on Broadway in New York City at The New Theatre on December 4, 1909.  The play was adapted to a novel, and a film adaptation, directed by Edgar Lewis, was made in 1915.  Because the title was controversial, the film was released in some markets as The Governor or The New Governor.

References

External links
 "The Nigger": An American Play in Three Acts at Google Books

Plays about race and ethnicity
American plays adapted into films
1909 plays
Melodramas
Broadway plays
Plays by Edward Sheldon